General elections were held in Puerto Rico on 3 November 1936. Voter turnout was 71.9%.

Santiago Iglesias Pantín of the Coalition was elected Resident Commissioner with 54% of the vote.

Results

Resident commissioner

Senate

At-large Senators

District Senators

House of Representatives

At-large Representatives

District Representatives

References

1936
1936 in Puerto Rico
1936 elections in the Caribbean